The Battle of Wilhelmsthal (sometimes written as the Battle of Wilhelmstadt) was fought on 24 June 1762 during the Seven Years' War between the allied forces of Britain, Prussia, Hanover, Brunswick and Hesse under the command of the Duke of Brunswick against France. Once again, the French threatened Hanover, so the Allies manoeuvered around the French, surrounded the invasion force, and forced them to retreat. It was the last major action fought by Brunswick's force before the Peace of Paris brought an end to the war.

Background
France had made a number of attempts to invade and overrun Hanover since 1757 in the hope of occupying the Electorate and using it as a bargaining counter to exchange for the return of French colonies captured by the British. The Allied army under the Duke of Brunswick had prevented them from taking Hanover, and by 1762, aware that the war was likely to draw to a close, the French had decided on a final thrust to try to defeat Brunswick and occupy Hanover.

Battle
Ferdinand had advanced and outflanked the French on both flanks, nearly encircling them. An attack on the French center held by Stainville's command was particularly effective, with one column engaging his front, another striking his rear, inflicting some 900 casualties and forcing 2,700 to surrender.

Aftermath
The result is viewed as victory for the Allied forces. It ended the last French hopes of overrunning and occupying Hanover before the armistice that ended the war and the Treaty of Paris. The Anglo-German forces advanced and captured Cassel in November, but by then, the preliminaries of peace had been signed.

See also
 Great Britain in the Seven Years War
 France in the Seven Years War

Footnotes

References

External links
Battle of Wilhelmsthal at www.britishbattles.com

Wilhelmsthal
Battles involving France
Battles involving Hesse-Kassel
Battles involving Prussia
Battles involving Great Britain
Battles of the Seven Years' War
1762 in the Holy Roman Empire
Battles in Hesse